Groundcover or ground cover is any plant that grows over an area of ground. Groundcover provides protection of the topsoil from erosion and drought.

In an ecosystem, the ground cover forms the layer of vegetation below the shrub layer known as the herbaceous layer. The most widespread ground covers are grasses of various types.

In ecology, groundcover is a difficult subject to address because it is known by several different names and is classified in several different ways. The term groundcover could also be referring to “the herbaceous layer,” “regenerative layer", “ground flora” or even "step over."

In agriculture, ground cover refers to anything that lies on top of the soil and protects it from erosion and inhibits weeds.  It can be anything from a low layer of grasses to a plastic material. The term ground cover can also specifically refer to landscaping fabric which is like a breathable tarp that allows water and gas exchange.

In gardening jargon, however, the term groundcover refers to plants that are used in place of weeds and improves appearance by concealing bare earth.

Contributions to the environment 

The herbaceous layer is often overlooked in most ecological analyses because it is so common and contributes the smallest amount of the environment's overall biomass. However, groundcover is crucial to the survival of many environments. The groundcover layer of a forest can contribute up to 90% of the ecosystem's plant diversity. Additionally, the herbaceous layer ratio of biomass to contribution to plant productivity is disproportionate in many ecosystems. The herbaceous layer can constitute up to 4% of the overall net primary productivity (NPP) of an ecosystem, four times its average biomass.

Reproduction
Groundcover typically reproduces one of five ways:
 Lateral growth 
 Side growth: Branches on the side of the plant extend outwards upon contact with the soil.
 Base growth: New plants produced from the base of the origin plant.
 Under/Above Ground growth: Produced from rhizomes and stolons
 Roots
Like most foliage, groundcover reacts to both natural and anthropogenic disturbances. These responses can be classified as legacy or active responses. Legacy responses occur during long-term changes to an environment, such as the conversion of a forest to agricultural land and back into forest. Active responses occur with sudden disturbances to the environment, such as tornadoes and forest fires.

Groundcover has also been known to influence the placement and growth of tree seedlings. All tree seedlings must first fall from their origin trees and then permeate the layer created by groundcover in order to reach the soil and germinate. The groundcover filters out a large amount seeds, but lets a smaller portion of seeds pass through and grow. This filtration provides ample amount of space between the seeds for future growth. In some areas, the groundcover can become so dense that no seeds can permeate the surface, and the forest is instead converted to shrubbery. Groundcover also inhibits the amount of light which reaches the floor of an ecosystem. An experiment conducted with the rhododendron maximum canopy in the southern Appalachian region concluded that 4 to 8% of total sunlight makes it to the herbaceous layer, whereas only about 1 to 2% reaches the ground.

Variation
Two common variations of groundcover are residency and transient species. Residency species typically reach a maximum of 1.5 meters in height, and are therefore permanently classified as herbaceous. Transient species are capable of growing past 1.5 meters, and are therefore only temporarily considered herbaceous. These height differences make ideal environments for a variety of animals, such as the reed warbler, the harvest mouse and the wren.

Groundcover can also be classified in terms of its foliage. Groundcover that keeps its foliage for the entire year is known as evergreen, whereas groundcover that loses its foliage in the winter months is known as deciduous.

In gardening 
 
 
 
Five general types of plants are commonly used as groundcovers in gardening:
 Vines, which are woody plants with slender, spreading stems
 Herbaceous plants, or non-woody plants
 Shrubs of low-growing, spreading species
 Moss of larger, coarser species
 Ornamental grasses, especially low-growing varieties

Of these types, some of the most common groundcovers include:

 Alfalfa (Medicago sativa)
 Clover (Trifolium)
 Dichondra
 Bacopa (Bacopa)
 Carpobrotus
 Delairea
 Ivy (Hedera)
 Gazania (Gazania rigens)
 Ground-elder (Aegopodium podagraria)
 Ice plant
 Japanese honeysuckle (Lonicera japonica)
 Juniperus horizontalis
 Creeping lantana
 Lilyturf (Liriope muscari and Liriope spicata)
 Mint (Mentha)
 Mesembryanthemum cordifolium
 Nasturtium (Tropaeolum majus)
 Pachysandra
 Pearlwort (Sagina subulata)
 Periwinkle (Vinca)
 Shasta daisy (Leucanthemum)
 Soleirolia (Soleirolia soleirolii)
 Spider plant (Chlorophytum comosum)

In roof gardens 
Groundcover is a popular solution for difficult gardening issues because it is low maintenance, aesthetically pleasing and fast growing, minimizing the spread of weeds. For this reason, ground cover is also a common choice for roof gardens. Roofs take on the brunt of incoming weather, meaning any plants on a roof must be resistant to long-term exposure to sun, overwatering from rain and harsh winds. Groundcover plants are able to sustain themselves in such conditions while also providing lush vegetation to what would otherwise be unused space.

See also
Cover crop
Robel pole
Living mulch
Tapestry lawn
:Category:Groundcovers

References

 
Plant morphology
Garden plants
Horticulture